Záhradné is a village and municipality in Prešov District in the Prešov Region of eastern Slovakia.

History
In historical records the village was first mentioned in 1285.

Geography

References

External links
http://www.obeczahradne.sk/

Villages and municipalities in Prešov District
Šariš